The Los Alamos Community Winds (LACW) is a wind ensemble made up of  members of the Los Alamos, New Mexico community and is composed of both amateur and professional musicians of all ages and backgrounds ranging from middle and high school students to retirees. The ensemble was recently awarded 1st Runner-up for the American Prize for Wind Ensembles and Concert Bands (Community Division.)

History 
The concert band has had a long history in Los Alamos and has seen various incarnations since the 1970s. Jan MacDonald, former band director at Los Alamos High School was director of the Los Alamos Concert Band (LACB) from the 1970s through the 1990s. The LACB performances included many weekly summer concerts as well as performing at various civic functions such as the 4th of July fireworks celebrations. The LACW is the latest organization to provide concert band performances to the Los Alamos community.

Director 
 Ted Vives

Goals 
To provide the Los Alamos community with a quality performing ensemble specializing in the best literature for the concert band and wind ensemble as a creative outlet and as a means for show casing individual musical talent.
 To promote public awareness of the importance of music, the arts, and other cultural events both as entertainment and as artistic endeavors.
 To instill and sustain the American heritage of concert band music at community festivals, commemorations and other public gatherings.
 To provide student musicians in the Los Alamos community with a good representation and model of ensemble performance.

External links 
 Los Alamos Community Winds (LACW)
 The American Prize - Winning BANDS & WIND ENSEMBLES, 2012

Wind bands